Macronyssus is a genus of bat and bird mites in the family Macronyssidae. There are about 14 described species in Macronyssus.

Species
These 14 species belong to the genus Macronyssus:

 Macronyssus angustus
 Macronyssus coreanus (Ah)
 Macronyssus crosbyi
 Macronyssus flavus (Kolenati, 1857)
 Macronyssus granulosus (Kolenati, 1856)
 Macronyssus kolenatii (Oudemans, 1902)
 Macronyssus meridionalis Radovski
 Macronyssus rhinolophi (Oudemans, 1902)
 Macronyssus sibiricus Orlova & Zhigalin, 2015
 Macronyssus stanyukovichi Orlova & Zhigalin, 2015
 Macronyssus tieni (Grokhovskaya & Nguen-Huan-Hoe)
 Macronyssus tigirecus Orlova & Zhigalin, 2015
 Macronyssus uncinatus (Canestrini, 1885)
 Macronyssus unidens Radovski

References

Mesostigmata
Articles created by Qbugbot
Parasites of bats